Sambe, or hemp fiber, is a traditional fiber for Korean clothing. The knowledge of weaving sambe skillfully is being lost, has been deemed a national treasure, and specific individuals with the ability were designated intangible cultural assets. Sambe was the primary textile fiber used in clothing for commoners prior to the introduction of cotton to Korea in the late 15th century. A particularly fine variety is andongpo from Andong, North Gyeongsang Province.

A Korean traditional funeral includes a sambe death dress for the deceased and sambe clothing for mourners. After commercial relations between China and Korea resumed in 1990, Chinese-made hemp cloth began to replace Korean cloth.

References

Newspaper sources

Book and journal sources
 via University of Nebraska at Lincoln digital commons

  UW Press page

External links

Traditional ways to enjoy cool, green summer Korean Culture and Information Service (korea.net)

Fibers
Hemp
Korean culture